Fluoroamphetamine may refer to:

 2-Fluoroamphetamine
 3-Fluoroamphetamine
 4-Fluoroamphetamine